Steve Teig is an American business leader, currently serving as the Chief Executive Officer of Perceive.

Teig received a B.S.E. degree in Electrical Engineering and Computer Science from Princeton University in 1982. He went on to co-found Simplex in 1998, and the firm was acquired by Cadence Design Systems in 2002. Following the acquisition, he served as the Chief Scientist of Cadence. In 2003, he left Cadence to co-found Tabula, where he served as the new firm's Chief Technology Officer (CTO). Tabula focused on the design of semiconductors, particularly FPGAs. Tabula shut down on March 24, 2015. Following the dissolution of Tabula, he became the CTO of Tessera Technologies. Tessera changed its name to Xperi in 2017.

In 2020, Teig became the CEO of the semiconductor company Perceive. The firm focuses on hardware for running machine learning software on mobile devices. Perceive was incubated at Xperi, and Xperi is the majority shareholder in the new company.

He currently holds over 369 patents.

References

External links 

 Steve Teig biography, Perceive.io website
 Steve Teig Lecture on New Ideas and Entrepreneurship to Stanford University Students, 2013.10.23
 Steve Teig Lecture on Spacetime 3D Programmable Integrated Circuits (11 min), 2012.06.18 
 Steve Teig Lecture on Spacetime 3D Programmable Integrated Circuits (61 min), 2012.10.07
 Edison Awards 2012: Presentation from Steve Teig (11 min), 2012.06.18

American chief technology officers
Princeton University alumni
American inventors
Living people
Year of birth missing (living people)